The European fallow deer (Dama dama), also known as the common fallow deer or simply  fallow deer, is a species of ruminant mammal belonging to the family Cervidae. It is historically native to Turkey and possibly the Italian Peninsula, Balkan Peninsula, and the island of Rhodes in Europe. Prehistorically native to and introduced into a larger portion of Europe, it has also been introduced to other regions in the world.

Taxonomy
Some taxonomists include the rarer Persian fallow deer as a subspecies (D. d. mesopotamica), with both species being grouped together as the fallow deer, while others treat it as a different species (D. mesopotamica). The white-tailed deer (Odocoileus virginianus) was once classified as Dama virginiana and the mule deer or black-tailed deer (Odocoileus hemionus) as Dama hemionus; they were given a separate genus in the 19th century.

Description

The male fallow deer is known as a buck, the female is a doe, and the young a fawn. Their lifespan is around 12–16 years.

Much variation occurs in the coat colour of the species, with four main variants: common, menil, melanistic, and leucistic – a genuine colour variety, not albinistic. White is the lightest coloured, almost white; common and menil are darker, and melanistic is very dark, sometimes even black (and is easily confused with the sika deer).

 Common: Chestnut coat with white mottles, it is most pronounced in summer with a much darker, unspotted coat in the winter. The light-coloured area around the tail is edged with black. The tail is light with a black stripe.
 Menil: Spots are more distinct than common in summer and no black is seen around the rump patch or on the tail. In winter, spots are still clear on a darker brown coat.
 Melanistic (black): All year the coat is black, shading to greyish-brown. No light-coloured tail patch or spots are seen.

 Leucistic (white, but not albino): Fawns are cream-coloured; adults become pure white, especially in winter. Dark eyes and nose are seen. The coat has no spots.

Most herds consist of the common coat variation, yet animals of the menil coat variation are not rare. The melanistic coat variation is generally rarer, and the white coat variation is very much rarer still, although wild New Zealand herds often have a high melanistic percentage.

Only bucks have antlers, which are broad and shovel-shaped (palmate) from three years. In the first two years the antler is a single spike. They are grazing animals; their preferred habitat is mixed woodland and open grassland. During the rut bucks spread out and females move between them; at that time of year fallow deer are relatively ungrouped compared with the rest of the year, when they try to stay together in groups of up to 150.

Being naturally less muscular than other cervids such as the roe deer, they are not as fast.

History

The European fallow deer was native to most of Europe during the last interglacial. Towards the end of the Pleistocene (during the last Ice Age) the distribution was restricted to the Middle East and refugia in parts of the Mediterranean Basin: Sicily, Anatolia and the Balkan. However, the fossil evidence of the species' prehistoric presence in these apparent refugia is extremely fragmentary, contributing to the ongoing confusion about the species' true range. Pleistocene fallow deer were larger, extant populations have evolved into smaller animals. Humans began to expand the distribution of this deer in the last two millennia by introducing it throughout Europe and further afield. In the Levant, fallow deer were an important source of meat in Palaeolithic cultures (420,000–200,000 BC), as is shown by bones, also used for conserving the marrow to be eaten weeks after the kill, found in the Qesem cave, but the species appears to have disappeared from the southern Levant in the following Epipalaeolithic Natufian culture, 13,000–7,500 BC, although gazelle and especially roe deer proliferated, perhaps because of climate change (increased aridity and the decrease of wooded areas), in combination with changing land use patterns and hunting pressure. At the same time the taxon persisted in the north in the Galilee region and the north of the West Bank.

Distribution

Native

Turkey 
Turkey is the only country known to have definitively natural populations of European fallow deer since the Last Glacial Maximum, but populations there (alongside those of the Persian fallow deer, which also formerly occurred in Turkey) have since become endangered and almost fully extirpated. European fallow deer in Anatolia underwent a major population decline due to the spread of agriculture (leading to the deforestation of lowland forests) and hunting, and populations in the Marmara and Aegean regions went extinct by the turn of 20th century. Other wild populations of Turkish fallow deer survived for longer on islands at Ayvalık Islands Nature Park, Gökova, and Adaköy near Marmaris, but also appear to have died out in recent years. Currently, the only extant wild population of the species known to be undoubtedly natural lives in Düzlerçami Game Reserve in the Mount Güllük-Termessos National Park in southern Turkey, although the area has been largely fenced since, making the population only semi-wild. This population is very few in number and is genetically distinct from other European fallow deer.

Native but originally extinct

Southern Balkans 
On mainland Greece and some Greek islands, such as Corfu, Kythira, and Thasos, that were connected to mainland due to lower sea level or proximity to land, fallow deer were present during the last ice age. A belief arose that the species was almost extinct in Greece, returning during the Neolithic. Contrary to that, remains indicate that reduced numbers survived in several parts of the country like in Thessaly, Peloponnese and Central Greece, increasing and becoming common during mid Neolithic, but mostly east of Pindus mountain range and especially in Macedonia and Thrace. During the Neolithic - Bronze Age periods the species still survives on the islands of Corfu and Thasos, appears on Euboea and starts getting introduced by man to other islands like Crete, some Cyclades, Rhodes, Chios, Lesbos, Samos and Sporades. Remains from early historical periods have been found in eastern Greece and on the islands of Thasos, Chios, Rhodes and Crete. On Samos island a few fallow deer were surviving in 1700, while on Lesbos island the fallow deer became extinct during the late Ottoman period. Wild fallow deer survived on mainland Greece till the 19th century in Evrytania and Boeotia and till the 1910s in Thesprotia, and the last individuals were hunted in Acarnania during the 1930s.

In Bulgaria, the autochthonous population of fallow deer is believed to have declined and disappeared after the 9th or 10th century and the species was reintroduced there recently.  In European Turkey, fallow deer were surviving in 19th century. The  fact  that  a  male  Fallow  Deer  was  captured  in  Thrace  in  1977  and  translocated  to  Düzlerçamı  may  indicate  that  a  small  population  existed  there  at  that  time. In Albania (possibly in Butrint), the fallow deer seemed to be plentiful during the first half of 19th century.

Possible native populations 
Aside from Turkey, other areas of Europe that could have potentially served as refuges for the species during the last ice age include parts of the eastern Mediterranean, including most of the Italian Peninsula, parts of the Balkans, and the Greek island of Rhodes, all of which still host populations of this species. However, palaeontological and archaeozoological evidence of the species' diffusion into these areas during the ice age is very fragmentary, thus whether the present populations in these areas are truly native descendants of relict populations or were introduced by humans is unknown. Presently, the IUCN Red List's range map lists European fallow deer as being native to Italy, Turkey, Rhodes, and most of the Balkans, as having a population of uncertain origin in central Bosnia and Herzegovina, and being introduced to the rest of Europe. In the text, though, all the eastern Mediterranean populations aside from Turkey are listed as having an uncertain origin.

Rhodes, Greece
The Rhodian population of European fallow deer is smaller on average than those of central and northern Europe, though they are similarly coloured. European fallow deer are said to have been introduced to Rhodes in Neolithic times; although fossils of the species on Rhodes do indeed go back to Neolithic times, no major evidence has been found of domestication, so they could be considered native. In 2005, the Rhodian fallow deer was found to be genetically distinct from all other populations and to be of urgent conservation concern. At the entrance to the harbour of Rhodes city, statues of a fallow deer buck and doe now grace the location where the Colossus of Rhodes once stood.

Introduced
Outside of Europe, this species has been introduced to Antigua and Barbuda, Argentina, South Africa, Fernando Pó, São Tomé, Madagascar, Mauritius, Mayotte, Réunion, the Seychelles, the Comoros, Morocco, Algeria, Tunisia, Cyprus, Israel, Cape Verde, Lebanon, Australia, New Zealand, Canada, the United States, the Falkland Islands, and Peru.

Australia 
European fallow deer were introduced to Tasmania in 1830 and to mainland Australia in the 1880s. The deer can now be found in all Australian jurisdictions, except Western Australia and the Northern Territory. The European fallow deer is the most widespread and numerous of introduced deer species in Australia. Proper control of deer populations in New South Wales (NSW) was precluded for some years by the classification of these deer as "game animals", as well as being a feral pest species. This led to an explosion in numbers, a vast increase in range in that state, impacts on agricultural production, increased environmental damage, and a dramatic increase in vehicle accidents involving deer. This policy has since been reversed on privately held land only, and on such land the deer is once again only classified as a feral pest species; they remain game animals on public land. The NSW government now asks the public to assist by not transporting or releasing feral deer onto any land, implying that intentional release of deer has been a factor in the vast increase in range in NSW in recent years.

Argentina
The European fallow deer was introduced to  Victoria Island in Neuquén Province by billionaire Aaron Anchorena, who intended to increase hunting opportunities. He freed wildlife of European and Asian origin, making them common inhabitants of the island.

Canada 
The European fallow deer is listed as an invasive species in the province of British Columbia. In 2021, the Canadian federal government, local First Nations, and local residents put forward a plan to eradicate the fallow deer population on Sidney Island, a small island located off the southwest coast of British Columbia.

Great Britain and Ireland

The European fallow deer was spread across Central Europe by the Romans. The Normans are thought to have first introduced them to Great Britain from Sicily for hunting in the royal forests. Recent finds at Fishbourne Roman Palace show that European fallow deer were introduced into southern England in the first century AD. Whether these escaped to form a feral colony, or they died out and were reintroduced by the Normans is unknown.

European fallow deer are now widespread on the UK mainland and are present in most of England and Wales south of a line drawn from the Wash to the Mersey. Populations in the New Forest and the Forest of Dean are long-standing, and many of the other populations originated from park escapees. They are not quite so widespread in the northern parts of England, but are present in most lowland areas and also in parts of Scotland, principally in Strathtay and around Loch Lomond. According to the British Deer Society distribution survey 2007, they have increased in range since the previous survey in 2000, although the increase in range is not as spectacular as for some of the other deer species.

A significant number of the European fallow deer in the Forest of Dean and in Epping Forest are of the black variety. One particularly interesting population, known as "long-haired fallow deer", inhabit Mortimer Forest on the England/Wales border; a significant part of the population has long body hair with distinct ear tufts.

A historical herd is at Phoenix Park in Ireland, where a herd of 400–450 European fallow deer descends from the original herd introduced in the 1660s.

New Zealand
From 1860, European fallow deer were introduced into New Zealand.  Significant herds exist in a number of low-altitude forests.

South Africa
European fallow deer are popular in the rural areas of KwaZulu-Natal for hunting purposes, in parts of the Gauteng Province to beautify ranches, and in the Eastern Cape where they were introduced on game farms for the hunting industry because of their exotic qualities. European fallow deer adapted extremely well to the South African environment with access to savanna grasslands and particularly in the cooler climate ranges such as the highveld.

Sweden
One noted historical herd of European fallow deer is located in the Ottenby nature reserve in Öland, where Charles X Gustav of Sweden erected a dry stone wall some 4 km long to enclose a royal fallow deer herd in the mid-17th century; the herd still exists as of 2006.

United States
In recent times, European fallow deer have been introduced in parts of the United States. A small feral population exists on one barrier island in Georgia. Fallow deer have also been introduced in Texas, along with many other exotic deer species, where they are often hunted on large game ranches.

In Pennsylvania, European fallow deer are considered livestock, since no feral animals are breeding in the wild.  Occasional reports of wild European fallow deer in Pennsylvania and Indiana are generally attributed to escapes from preserves or farms.

A herd of white European fallow deer is located near Argonne National Laboratories in northeastern Illinois.

A small herd of 15 mostly white European fallow deer resides at the Belle Isle Nature Zoo on Belle Isle in Detroit, Michigan.  Until the turn of the 21st century, this herd had the run of the island; the herd was thereafter confined, with extirpation being the initial goal.

A small herd, believed to be the oldest in the United States, exists in the Land Between the Lakes National Recreation Area (LBL) in far western Kentucky and Tennessee. The European fallow deer herd in the LBL "was brought to LBL by the Hillman Land Company in 1918. LBL's herd is believed to be the oldest population of fallow deer in the country, and at one time was the largest. Today, the herd numbers fewer than 150 and hunting of fallow deer is not permitted. Although LBL's wildlife management activities focus on native species, the fallow herd is maintained for wildlife viewing and because of its historical significance."

European fallow deer are present in the Point Reyes National Seashore, California, and Mendocino County near Ridgewood Ranch, west of Redwood Valley, California; some of them are leucistic.

Mating system 
European fallow deer are highly dimorphic, polygynous breeders; the breeding season or rut lasts about 135 days. In the Northern Hemisphere, the breeding season tends to occur in the second half of October, while it occurs in April in the Southern Hemisphere, some matings can still occur before and after. This mating behaviour within the rut most often occurs in leks, where males congregate in small groups on mating territories in which the females’ only purpose for visiting these territories is for copulation. Variation within European fallow deer mating systems occurs; other than the traditional behaviour of lekking, different types of mating behaviours can include harems, dominance groups, stands, temporary stands, and multiple stands. Different populations, environmental variation, size, and even age can determine the type of variation within a European fallow deer mating system, but lekking behaviour is the most commonly found and studied in nature; variation can be explained by three characteristics (1) the optimal strategy under specific environmental or social conditions, (2) the strategy of an individual may be dependent on the strategies of other individual males within the same population, and (3) individual males may be less capable at gaining access to females, since they can be outcompeted by other males that are more capable.

Female European fallow deer are polyestrous; they are receptive to males during multiple periods of estrus throughout the mating season while not gestating. Male rut behaviour includes licking and sniffing around the anus and vulva to determine whether a female is fertile. Males produce high-pitched whines repeatedly to initiate mating; following this display, a female may allow the male to mount; copulation can last as long as 5 minutes.

Ecology and mating system characteristics 

Many deer species—including European fallow deer—have a social organization that can be tremendously plastic depending on their environment, meaning that group size and habitat type are closely linked to herd size. Most of the detailed research on the ecological characteristics and behaviour of European fallow deer occurs in large blocks of woodland, which means some bias may be present. European fallow deer can be found in a variety of habitats, which can range from cool and wet to hot and dry. European fallow deer seem to have a preference for older forests with dispersed areas of grass, trees, and a variety of other vegetation. The largest herd occurs right before the rutting season, while the smallest groups are females with fawns. Throughout a large portion of the year, the sexes remain separated and only congregate during the mating months, but other patterns may be described, such as bachelor groups and even mixed groups.

Male European fallow deer produce low-frequency vocalizations called groans; the sound of these groans results from the consistent and complex shape of the vocal tract involving the oral and nasal cavities.

Ruts are characterized by males gaining the best territory possible to increase their odds for mating, and are often characterized by the presence of females on stands. During this time, males stop feeding to defend their ruts from subordinate males. Males defending this territory often lose an average of 17% of their body weight, and the liver exhibits steatosis, which is reversible. Throughout breeding seasons, the males may obtain the same rut; in some cases, ruts can be held by more than one individual; some possibilities for this include high population density and less rut space, or more suitable habitats, which can be shared.

Parental care 

After a female is impregnated, gestation lasts up to 245 days. Usually one fawn is born; twins are rare. The females can conceive when they are 16 months old, whereas the males can successfully breed at 16 months, but most do not breed until they are 48 months old. The females can become very cagey just before they give birth to their fawn and find secluded areas such as a bush or cave; sometimes females give birth near the herd. As soon as the female gives birth, the she then licks the fawn to clean it; this helps initiate the maternal bond between the two, and only females provide parental investment; males do not participate in rearing the fawn.

After the birth of the fawn occurs, the females do not return to the herd for at least 10 days and for most of the days the mother is separated from the fawn, returning only to feed the fawn. The nursing period lasts about 4 months and happens every 4 hours each day. Rumination is a critical part of development in the fawn's life, and this develops about 2 to 3 weeks into the fawn's life. Females initiate the weaning periods for the fawn, which lasts about 20 days; 3 to 4 weeks; later, the fawn will start to follow its mother, and they will finally rejoin the herd together. The mother frequently licks the fawn's anal area to stimulate suckling, urination, and defecation, which is a critical part of the development of the fawn. Weaning is completed at around 7 months, and at around 12 months, the fawn is independent; after the 135 days of reproduction, the rut comes to an end, which can be characterized by the changes in group size and behaviour.

Contests and weaponry 

Since European fallow deer are polygynous species that congregate once every year, males must fight to obtain access to estrous females. The relationship between antler size and body condition can be treated as indicators to reflect body condition within a given year. These secondary sexual characteristics can have dual functions, which include the attractiveness of males, which females can ultimately choose, and fighting ability of the male. It was found that males with larger antlers had higher mating success, where males with asymmetrical antlers did not. When males develop their antlers,  trade-offs always are made between reproduction and survival, which can shape the decision in an individual's choice. Genetic variations exist within fallow deer populations with variable antler growth, males that exhibited faster-growing antlers early in life are able to grow longer antlers without any significant cost; this shows that there is, in fact, phenotypic variation among fallow deer populations.

Aggressive behaviour is often observed when individuals are seeking out mates, scarce resources, and even territories. Species that compete using their weapons usually engage with mutual agreement, but if any noticeable asymmetries are seen, such as a broken or lost weapon, this may alter the behaviour of an individual to engage in a fight.  Likelihood and severity of antler damage were looked at in fallow deer, to test whether antler damage was associated with contest tactics and duration, and if an association existed with the tendency for individuals to engage in fighting. Individuals with undamaged antlers were more likely to attack, using high-risk tactics that included jumping, clashing, or backward-pushing behaviour, this was exhibited by both contestants; dominant males were more likely to have damaged antlers. Dominance ranks exist within fallow deer populations, which can be linked to aggression level and body size; when competing for a male, however, how ranks are obtained is not studied extensively.

Endurance rivalry 
Male fallow deer are highly competitive during the rutting season; successful mating depends mainly on body size and dominance rank. Many factors can determine the seasonal reproductive success of an individual male fallow deer; these factors include body size, which can affect reproduction and survival. The amount of time spent in a lek can be an important factor in determining male reproductive success; energy can play an important role for the duration of competitive leks. Among ungulates, European fallow deer exhibit one of the most outstanding examples of sexual dimorphism, as males are much larger than females. For sexual selection to lead to the evolution of sexual dimorphism, where males are bigger than females,  advantages must be present: (1) Advantages during combat, (2) Endurance rivalry advantage, (3) Female preference for larger males, and (4) Advantages during sperm competition. Sexual selection has chosen bigger males over an evolutionary time scale and conferred advantages during competition of mates by a variety of mechanisms, which are intrasexual competition, access to females, and resource accessibility, which affects attractiveness to females.

Body size is important during male-male agonistic interactions and endurance rivalry, while females tend to have a preference for larger males. Dominance rank is a good indicator of body size and body mass, but age was not an important factor. In a study done by McElligott et al. (2001), it was found that mating success was related to body size, pre-rut and rut rank. Similarly, in another study, researchers found that age, weight, and display effort were all significant factors in determining mating success; in both studies, mating success was measured by the frequency of copulations, which means that a variety of factors in different fallow deer populations can affect the overall energy allocation which will ultimately affect mating success. Maternal investment early in life can be critical to the development of body size, since it can be quite variable at that stage depending on resources and habitat type. Mature male body size can be a better indicator of overall male quality rather than body mass, since body mass depends on a variety of resources each year and is not a static trait; body mass can be a complex trait to measure.

Threats 
Since the 20th century, a serious decline in the populations of European fallow deer has been seen in Turkey, the only region where it is definitely thought to be native, and it has disappeared from almost all regions where it was formerly found aside from Düzlerçami Game Reserve in the Mount Güllük-Termessos National Park, where a semiwild, genetically distinct population exists. The Turkish government undertook a breeding program at Düzlerçami starting in 1966, with the population growing from 7 to 500 animals, but it underwent a massive collapse until 2000 due to reasons not fully understood, but thought to be linked to urbanisation, recreational activities, and poaching, and numbered less than 30 (with only 10 individuals roaming outside the fenced areas) individuals by 2007 and less than 130 individuals by 2010. This population remains at risk from inbreeding and poaching. Reintroduction to other areas of Turkey has not been successful but should still be considered to increase the species' population.

The population on Rhodes, which is of uncertain origin, but is known to be very genetically distinct from others, is also of major conservation concern. It numbers around 400-500 animals and is at risk from poaching and wildfires. The population is also at risk of outbreeding depression, as in some parts of Rhodes, mainland European fallow deer are kept in fenced areas; these deer could escape and breed with the Rhodian fallow deer. Rhodian fallow deer also damage summer crops and due to a lack of a compensation system, persecution against the population could happen. A reduction of water resources on the island due to climate change could also affect the animals. Despite this, there are signs of population recovery on Rhodes as of 2008 due to conservation measures.

Despite these threats, the European fallow deer is common across the other areas where it could potentially be native, as well as the areas throughout Europe that it was introduced to early on, thus it is considered to be of least concern by the IUCN Red List.

See also
 Deer of Great Britain

References

Further reading
 Clutton-Brock, J. (1978). A Natural History of Domesticated Animals. London: British Museum.
 de Vos, Antoon (1982). Deer farming guidelines on practical aspects. FAO ANIMAL PRODUCTION AND HEALTH PAPER 27. . . Retrieved on 4 January 2008.
 Lyneborg, L. (1971). Mammals [of Europe]. .
 Level 1 DSC Training Manual. https://web.archive.org/web/20090212222910/http://www.eskdalewildlife.com/training.html

External links

 Fallow deer in New Zealand 
 Kentucky Lake Barkley wildlife viewing
 Fallow Deer Fighting

Cervines
Fauna of the Falkland Islands
Introduced mammals of Australia
Mammals described in 1758
Mammals of Africa
Mammals of Asia
Mammals of Europe
Mammals of Madagascar
Mammals of Mauritius
Mammals of New Zealand
Mammals of North Africa
Mammals of Peru
Mammals of Réunion
Mammals of South Africa
Mammals of Sub-Saharan Africa
Mammals of the Comoros
Deer, Fallow
Mammals of Turkey
Taxa named by Carl Linnaeus